Den vilda (meaning "The wild one") is a winter-related song by Swedish band One More Time, written by . It won the Melodifestivalen 1996 and hence became the  entry at the Eurovision Song Contest 1996, held in Oslo, Norway.

The song was performed as the 23rd and last entry in the contest. At the close of the voting it had received 100 points and placed 3rd out of 23 entries. It also peaked at #7 on the Swedish Singles Chart.

Charts

Weekly charts

Year-end charts

Recordings in other languages
 "The Wilderness Mistress" is the English version of "Den vilda", released by One More Time in 1996.
 "Dansaðu vindur" is a 2008 adaptation in Icelandic interpreted by Eivør Pálsdóttir from the Faroe Islands. The single is taken from the 14-track Icelandic compilation album Frostrósir – Heyr Himnasmiður with contributions by a number of well-known artists.

References

Eurovision songs of 1996
Eurovision songs of Sweden
Melodifestivalen songs of 1996
One More Time (band) songs
Songs written by Nanne Grönvall
1996 songs
Sony Music singles
1996 singles
Swedish-language songs